Anisur Rahman (died 2004) was an Indian politician of 3rd Legislative Assembly (1962–67) of Uttar Pradesh representing Indian National Congress. He represented 16-Tanakpur Vidhan Sabha seat which included Tanakpur, Sitarganj, Nanakmatta, Khatima, Amariya. The seat was part of Nainital district. He was part of the U.P government under first women chief minister Sucheta Kripalani.

He belongs to Rayeen tribe of Sunni Muslims. His native place was Dherum Sukatia village of Pilibhit. He contested second time from Pilibhit assembly in 1974 and lost by a thin margin of 3887 votes. He remained active in the politics till 2000 and held key posts in the congress committee as PCC member and district vice president and General secretary.

See also
Kazi Jalil Abbasi
Zulfikar Ali Khan

References

Uttar Pradesh MLAs 1962–1967
20th-century Indian Muslims
20th-century Indian politicians
People from Pilibhit
2004 deaths
Indian National Congress politicians from Uttar Pradesh